Never Twice is a 2019 South Korean television series starring Park Se-wan, Kwak Dong-yeon, Youn Yuh-jung, Oh Ji-ho, Ye Ji-won, Park Ah-in and Song Won-seok. It aired on MBC TV from November 2, 2019 to March 7, 2020.

Synopsis
The series follows the story of the long-term guests at Paradise Inn, located in the heart of Seoul and their relationship with Guseong Hotel owners.

Cast

Main
 Park Se-wan as Geum Park-ha, a pure young woman who lives in room No. 4 of Paradise Inn. She came from a coastal city and bravely moves into the metropolis.
 Kwak Dong-yeon as Na Hae-jun, the heir of a five-star hotel called Guseong Hotel, which is located right across the street from Paradise Inn. He is the head of its strategic planning department.
 Youn Yuh-jung as Bok Mak-rye, the owner of Paradise Inn.
 Oh Ji-ho as Gam Poong-gi, a man who lives in room No. 5 of Paradise Inn. He has the perfect looks and voice that captures women's heart.
 Ye Ji-won as Bang Eun-ji, a beautiful woman who lives in room No. 6 of Paradise Inn. She looks younger than her age and has an honest personality, but has never properly dated a man.
 Park Ah-in as Na Hae-ri, Wang-sam's granddaughter who is the head of marketing at Guseong Hotel.
 Song Won-seok as Kim Woo-jae, a golf player who lives in room No. 3 of Paradise Inn. He came from Gangwon Province and learned golf on his own.

Supporting
 Joo Hyun as Choi Geo-bok, an elderly romantic gentleman who has come to Paradise Inn to meet his first love from over 50 years ago, Mak-rye.
 Han Jin-hee as Na Wang-sam, the chairman and founder of Guseong Hotel.
 Park Joon-geum as Do Do-hee, Wang-sam's first daughter-in-law and Hae-ri's mother.
 Hwang Young-hee as On In-suk, Wang-sam's second daughter-in-law and Hae-jun's mother.
 Jung Suk-yong as Choi Man-ho, a bakery chef who is entangled with Guseong Hotel.
 Go Soo-hee as Yang Geum-hee, Man-ho's wife who is a skin care worker at Guseong Hotel.

Notes

References

External links
  
 
 

MBC TV television dramas
Korean-language television shows
2019 South Korean television series debuts
2020 South Korean television series endings
Television series by Pan Entertainment